The list of ship commissionings in 2020 includes a chronological list of all ships commissioned in 2020.


References

See also

2020